WAMR may refer to:

 WAMR-FM, a radio station (107.5 FM) licensed to Miami, Florida, United States
 Pitu Airport in Morotai, Maluku Islands, Indonesia